Final Damnation is a live album by the Damned. The album was recorded at The Town & Country Club in London on 13 June 1988. It was originally released in August 1989 by Essential, and was later re-released on DVD.

The set begins with the original line-up and morphs through the various line-ups of the band, each playing on the tracks which that lineup recorded in the studio. It was recorded at a time when the band were in a chaotic state, without a record contract, after being dropped by their only major label, MCA. Various line-ups based on this show would tour until the Damned released the "Fun Factory" single.

Track listing
"See Her Tonite"
"Neat Neat Neat"
"Born to Kill"
"I Fall"
"Fan Club"
"Fish"
"Help!"
"New Rose"
"I Feel Alright"
"I Just Can't Be Happy Today"
"Wait for the Blackout"
"Melody Lee"
"Noise Noise Noise"
"Love Song"
"Smash It Up Parts I & II"
"Looking at You"
"The Last Time"

Personnel
Dave Vanian − vocals
Rat Scabies − drums
Brian James – guitar (1–9, 16, 17)
Captain Sensible – bass (1–9), guitar (10–17), backing vocals
Bryn Merrick – bass (10–17), backing vocals
Roman Jugg – keyboards (10–17), backing vocals

References

The Damned (band) live albums
1989 live albums